Nusrat Javed, is a Pakistani columnist, journalist and a former news anchor.

Early life and career
(Either his date of birth or date when he started his career not correct. He could not have graduated at the age of eleven and started career in 1975. Can someone correct this.) (Comments by A K Shaikh).

Nusrat Javed was born on 14 March 1964. He is among the senior most journalists in Pakistan having started his career in 1975. Beginning as a reporter, he made a mark as a columnist, before shifting to television. However, since 2019, he is no longer associated with television, and instead concentrates on writing columns. Though based in Islamabad, his writings often show a longing for his city of Lahore.

Javed began his television career with his program Bolta Pakistan on AAJ TV in 2007. He and his co-host, Mushtaq Minhas, then moved to Dunya TV to host the talk show Dunya Mere Agay, which followed the same format as Bolta Pakistan, but later came back to AAJ TV to resume Bolta Pakistan. His last stint as a news anchor was with AAP TV, and since then he has concentrated on writings columns. Nusrat Javed is known for his reporting on parliamentary affairs titled "Notes from the Press Gallery."

Javed used to co-host the show Bolta Pakistan on AAJ TV with Mushtaq Minhas. He also writes columns in Urdu and English for an Urdu daily newspaper Nawa-i-Waqt and The Nation respectively. On 22 January 2015, Nusrat Javed joined BOL News as Executive Vice President & Senior Anchorperson. Javed was the first Pakistani reporter to cover Indian elections in 1984 and since then, he has covered all elections held in Pakistan as well as India. He also has extensive experience in coverage of the conflict zones, including Iraq, Lebanon and Afghanistan.

TV shows 
He has worked on the following shows:
 Bolta Pakistan (Aaj TV)
 Dunya Mere Aagay (Dunya TV)
 Bol Bol Pakistan (Dawn TV) 
 Baharhall (AAP TV)

He left Aaj News in 2016 to join Dawn News to present the talk show Bol Bol Pakistan hosted by Gulmeenay Sethi. However, the show was taken off air in November 2018 citing financial reasons, though industry experts viewed it otherwise referring to the episode as another incident where media houses were pressurised to take off programs considered unfavourable to the ruling government and the state. His last television programme was called Baharhall with host Aniq Naji and Mishal Bukhari on AAP TV, after which he returned to full-time column writing.

References 

Living people
Pakistani male journalists
Pakistani television talk show hosts
BOL Network people
Urdu-language journalists
Urdu-language columnists
21st-century Urdu-language writers
1964 births